At nearly 200 metres, Smokey Hole Cave in Manchester, Jamaica is the deepest known cave in the island.

Natural history
The cave contains a large bat roost and numerous Jamaican cave crickets (Uvaroviella cavicola). Also present are the invasive Periplaneta americana (cockroach) in small numbers, Gaucelmus cavernicola (spider), and Neoditomyia farri (fly).

See also
 List of caves in Jamaica
Jamaican Caves Organisation
Manchester Parish, Jamaica

References

External links
Map.
Aerial view.
Photos.
Smokey Hole Cave - Field Notes.

Bat roosts
Caves of Jamaica
Geography of Manchester Parish
Caves of the Caribbean